Stephen Mark Kotkin (born February 17, 1959)  is an American historian, academic, and author. He is currently the Kleinheinz Senior Fellow at the Hoover Institution and a senior fellow at the Freeman Spogli Institute for International Studies at Stanford University. For 33 years, Kotkin previously taught at Princeton University, where he attained the title of John P. Birkelund '52 Professor in History and International Affairs, and he took emeritus status from Princeton University in 2022. He was the director of the Princeton Institute for International and Regional Studies and the co-director of the certificate program in History and the Practice of Diplomacy. He has won a number of awards and fellowships, including the Guggenheim Fellowship, the American Council of Learned Societies and the National Endowment for the Humanities Fellowship.
 
Kotkin's most prominent book project is his three-volume biography of Joseph Stalin, of which the first two volumes have been published as Stalin: Paradoxes of Power, 1878–1928 (2014) and Stalin: Waiting for Hitler, 1929–1941 (2017), while the third volume remains to be published.

Academic career
Kotkin graduated from the University of Rochester in 1981 with a B.A. degree in English. He studied Russian and Soviet history under Reginald E. Zelnik and Martin Malia at the University of California, Berkeley, where he earned an M.A. degree in 1983 and a Ph.D. degree in 1988, both in history. Initially his PhD studies focused on the House of Habsburg and the History of France, until an encounter with Michel Foucault persuaded him to look at the relationship between knowledge and power with respect to Stalin.

Starting in 1986, Kotkin traveled to the Soviet Union, and then, he travelled to Russia multiple times, where he conducted academic research and received academic fellowships. He was a visiting scholar at the USSR Academy of Sciences (1991) and then at its descendant, the Russian Academy of Sciences (1993, 1995, 1998, 1999 and 2012). He was also a visiting scholar at University of Tokyo's Institute of Social Science in 1994 and 1997.

Kotkin joined the faculty at Princeton University in 1989 and was the director of the Russian and Eurasian Studies Program for thirteen years (1995–2008) and the co-director of the certificate program in History and the Practice of Diplomacy (2015–2022). He was John P. Birkelund '52 Professor in History and International Affairs at Princeton. He is now the Kleinheinz Senior Fellow at the Hoover Institution.

Author 
Kotkin has written several nonfiction books about history as well as textbooks. Among scholars of Russia, he is best known for Magnetic Mountain: Stalinism as a Civilization which exposes the realities of everyday life in the Soviet city of Magnitogorsk during the 1930s. In 2001, he published Armageddon Averted, a short history of the fall of the Soviet Union.

Kotkin is a frequent contributor on Russian and Eurasian affairs and he also writes book and film reviews for various publications, including The New Republic, The New Yorker, the Financial Times, The New York Times and The Washington Post. He also contributed as a commentator for NPR and the BBC. In 2017, Kotkin wrote in The Wall Street Journal that Communist democide resulted in the deaths of at least 65 million people between 1917 and 2017, stating: "Though communism has killed huge numbers of people intentionally, even more of its victims have died from starvation as a result of its cruel projects of social engineering."

His first volume in a projected trilogy on the life of Stalin, Stalin: Paradoxes of Power, 1878–1928 (976 pp., Penguin Random House, 2014) analyzes his life through 1928, and was a Pulitzer Prize finalist. It received reviews in newspapers, magazines, and academic journals, The second volume, Stalin: Waiting for Hitler, 1929–1941 (1184 pp., Penguin Random House, 2017) also received several reviews, magazines, and academic journals upon its release. In these books, among other things, Stephen Kotkin suggested that Lenin's Testament was authored by Nadezhda Krupskaya. Kotkin pointed out that the purported dictations were not logged in the customary manner by Lenin's secretariat at the time they were supposedly given; that they were typed, with no shorthand originals in the archives, and that Lenin did not affix his initials to them; that by the alleged dates of the dictations, Lenin had lost much of his power of speech following a series of small strokes on December 15-16, 1922, raising questions about his ability to dictate anything as detailed and intelligible as the Testament and that the dictation given in December 1922 is suspiciously responsive to debates that took place at the 12th Communist Party Congress in April 1923. However, the Testament has been accepted as genuine by many historians, including E. H. Carr, Isaac Deutscher, Dmitri Volkogonov, Vadim Rogovin and Oleg Khlevniuk. Kotkin's claims were also rejected  by Richard Pipes soon after they were published, who claimed Kotkin contradicted himself by citing documents in which Stalin referred to the Testament as the "known letter of comrade Lenin." Pipes also points to the inclusion of the document in Lenin's Collected Works.

Kotkin is currently writing the third volume, Stalin: Miscalculation and the Mao Eclipse (TBA). He is also writing a multi-century history of Siberia, focusing on the Ob River Valley.

Published works

References

External links 
 Available articles and publications for download at Princeton University.
 Author talk on Stalin: Volume I: Paradoxes of Power, 1878–1928 at Politics and Prose. YouTube. March 11, 2015.
 Stalin's early years and Mein Kampf. BBC. January 1, 2015.

Historians of Russia
Historians of communism
21st-century American historians
21st-century American male writers
Hoover Institution people
Hoover Institution Edwards Media Fellows
Princeton University faculty
Stalinism-era scholars and writers
University of California, Berkeley alumni
University of Rochester alumni
American people of Polish descent
Living people
1959 births
Writers about the Soviet Union
Historians of the Soviet Union
American male non-fiction writers